In projective geometry, Segre's theorem, named after the Italian mathematician Beniamino Segre, is the statement:
Any oval in a finite pappian projective plane of odd order is a nondegenerate projective conic section.

This statement was assumed 1949 by the two Finnish mathematicians G. Järnefelt and P. Kustaanheimo and its proof was published in 1955 by B. Segre.

A finite pappian projective plane can be imagined as the projective closure of the real plane (by a line at infinity), where the real numbers are replaced by a finite field . Odd order means that  is odd. An oval is a curve similar to a circle (see definition below): any line meets it in at most 2 points and through any point of it there is exactly one tangent. The standard examples are the nondegenerate projective conic sections.

In pappian projective planes of even order greater than four there are ovals which are not conics. In an infinite plane there exist ovals, which are not conics. In the real plane one just glues a half of a circle and a suitable ellipse smoothly.

The proof of Segre's theorem, shown below, uses the 3-point version of Pascal's theorem and a property of a finite field of odd order, namely, that the product of all the nonzero elements equals -1.

Definition of an oval 

In a projective plane a set  of points is called oval, if:
(1) Any line  meets  in at most two points.
If  the line  is an exterior (or passing) line; in case  a tangent line and if  the line is a secant line.

For finite planes (i.e. the set of points is finite) we have a more convenient characterization:
 For a finite projective plane of order  (i.e. any line contains  points) a set  of points is an oval if and only if  and no three points are collinear (on a common line).

Pascal's 3-point version 

Theorem
Let be  an oval in a pappian projective plane of characteristic . 
 is a nondegenerate conic if and only if statement (P3)
holds:
 
 
are collinear.

Proof
Let the projective plane be coordinatized inhomogeneously over a field  
Furthermore, we set  (s. image)
The oval  can be described by a function  such that:

The tangent at point  will be described using a function  such that its equation is
 
Hence (s. image)
 and  

II: If  is an oval with property (P3), the slope of the line  is equal to the slope of the line , that means:
 and hence
(i):  for all  . 
With   one gets
(ii):  and from  we get 
(iii):  
(i) and (ii) yield
(iv):  and with (iii) at least we get 
(v):  for all . 
A consequence of (ii) and (v) is   
. 
Hence  is a nondegenerate conic.

Remark:
Property (P3) is fulfilled for any oval in a pappian projective plane of characteristic 2 with a nucleus (all tangents meet at the nucleus). Hence in this case (P3) is also true for non-conic ovals.

Segre's theorem and its proof 
Theorem
Any oval  in a finite pappian projective plane of odd order is a nondegenerate conic section.

Proof
For the proof we show that the oval has property (P3) of the 3-point version of Pascal's theorem.

The pappian plane will be coordinatized inhomogeneously over a finite field 
The oval  can be described using a bijective function :

(Remark: For  we have: 
)
Hence

Because the slopes of line   and tangent
.
This is true for any triangle .

So: (P3) of the 3-point Pascal theorem holds and the oval is a non degenerate conic.

References

Sources 
 B. Segre: Ovals in a finite projective plane, Canadian Journal of Mathematics 7 (1955), pp. 414–416.
 G. Järnefelt & P. Kustaanheimo: An observation on finite Geometries, Den 11 te Skandinaviske Matematikerkongress, Trondheim (1949), pp. 166–182.
 Albrecht Beutelspacher, Ute Rosenbaum: Projektive Geometrie. 2. Auflage. Vieweg, Wiesbaden 2004, p. 162.
 P. Dembowski: Finite Geometries. Springer-Verlag, 1968, p. 149

External links 
 Simeon Ball and Zsuzsa Weiner: An Introduction to Finite Geometry  p. 17.

Conic sections
Theorems in projective geometry
Articles containing proofs
Projective geometry
Incidence geometry